Kablar (Serbian Cyrillic: Каблар) is a mountain in central Serbia. It has an elevation of 889 meters above sea level. It lies near the city of Čačak. With nearby Ovčar, it forms the Ovčar-Kablar Gorge of the West Morava river.

References

Mountains of Serbia